The Delaware Wave is a Gannett-owned English-language newspaper based in Bethany Beach, Delaware. Seventeen staff members publish the weekly 11-inch by 17-inch newspaper, every Tuesday, and distribute it to the public on Wednesdays. It serves from Bethany Beach and Fenwick Island to Georgetown and Selbyville with local news. Online, it is known as Delmarva Now. Founded in 1999, it is one of three Gannett newspapers in Delaware that together have a circulation of approximately 22,000 per week.

Sections 
 News
 Perspective (changed to Voices in March 2008)
 Health Matters (changed to Health in March 2008)
 Education
 Business
 Shorelife
 Our Neighbors
 Faith & Family (Eliminated in December 2008)
 Real Estate (Eliminated in December 2008)
 Sports
 Obituaries (changed to Area Deaths in March 2008)

Towns in coverage area 
 Bethany Beach, Delaware
 Clarksville, Delaware
 Dagsboro, Delaware
 Fenwick Island, Delaware
 Frankford, Delaware
 Georgetown, Delaware
 Millville, Delaware
 Millsboro, Delaware
 Ocean View, Delaware
 Omar, Delaware
 Roxana, Delaware
 Selbyville, Delaware
 South Bethany, Delaware

Schools in coverage area 
 Indian River School District
 Sussex Technical School District

Affiliations 
As part of the Delmarva Media Group, The Delaware Wave is one of many weekly newspapers that works in conjunction with The Daily Times in Salisbury, Maryland.

Other Delmarva Media Group publications include:
 The Delaware Coast Press
 The Chincoteague Beacon
 The Delaware-Maryland Beachcomber
 The Eastern Shore News
 The Ocean Pines Independent
 The Worcester County Times
 The Somerset Herald
 The Virginia Beachcomber
 Go! Magazine
 Shorewoman

The Delaware Wave was acquired by Gannett Media Company in 2000 and is now affiliated with the USA Today Network.

The other Gannett newspapers in Delaware are The Delaware Coast Press and Wilmington's The News Journal.

References

External links 
 delawarewave.com and delmarvanow.com

Newspapers published in Delaware
Sussex County, Delaware
1999 establishments in Delaware